St. Mary's Ukrainian Catholic Church, Manchester is situated on Cheetham Hill Road, close to its junction with Middleton Road and Leicester Road in North Manchester, England.

It is under the jurisdiction of the Apostolic Exarchate for Ukrainians in Great Britain of the Ukrainian Greek Catholic Church.

External links
Multi-Cultural Manchester: Ukrainians 
History of the Ukrainian Community in Manchester
Dormition of Our Lady, Cheetham - Ukrainian Catholic Church 

Ukrainian Catholic churches in the United Kingdom
Roman Catholic churches in Manchester